Jennifer Robertson (born November 24, 1971) is a Canadian actress, writer, and comedian. She is known for her starring role as Jocelyn Schitt in the CBC Emmy Award-winning sitcom Schitt's Creek (2015–2020), for which she was nominated for two Screen Actors Guild Awards (winning one) and four Canadian Screen Awards.

She has appeared in numerous other shows, including the CBC comedy series This Hour Has 22 Minutes (2003–2004), the CTV sketch comedy series Comedy Inc. (2003–2010), the Disney Channel fantasy film Twitches (2005), the Family Channel teen sitcom Wingin' It (2010–2012), and the Netflix series Ginny & Georgia (2021–present).

Early life
Robertson was born in Canada, the daughter of Bob Robertson who was one half of comedy duo Double Exposure. Raised in Vancouver, British Columbia, she has a brother, Patrick.

Career
Robertson made her acting debut in a 1998 episode of the sketch comedy series SketchCom. She went on to appear in various other television series, including Twice in a Lifetime (2001), Point Blank (2002), The Gavin Crawford Show (2002), and The Seán Cullen Show (2003).

She received further recognition for writing and starring in the comedy series This Hour Has 22 Minutes (2003–2004) and Comedy Inc. (2003–2010).

In 2004, Robertson wrote and starred in the lead role of the television film To Die 4. In 2005, she starred in the Disney Channel made-for-television film Twitches. She went on to appear in other American made-for-television film, including Knights of the South Bronx (2005) and Relative Chaos (2006). She also co-starred as anchorwoman Jennifer Lange in the short-lived Fox News Channel satire comedy series The 1/2 Hour News Hour (2007).

Robertson guest starred as an annoyed flight attendant in the Disney Channel sitcom Hannah Montana (2007), and voiced Tricia in the animated teen comedy series 6teen. She starred as Angela Montclaire in the Family Channel teen sitcom Wingin' It, which aired from April 2010 to May 2012. She portrayed Cece Goldsworthy in the tenth season of the long-running teen drama series Degrassi: The Next Generation (2010–2011). From 2013 to 2014, she hosted the HGTV reality competition series Canada's Handyman Challenge.

Robertson gained further acclaim for her starring role of Jocelyn Schitt, the mayor's wife, in the CBC sitcom Schitt's Creek (2015–2020). For her performance in the series, she earned a nomination for the Screen Actors Guild Award for Outstanding Performance by an Ensemble in a Comedy Series and four Canadian Screen Awards for Best Supporting or Guest Actress in a Comedy.

In 2020, Robertson was cast in one of the lead roles in the Netflix drama series Ginny & Georgia. Robertson stars as Ellen Baker in all ten episodes of the series, which premiered on Netflix on February 24, 2021, and attracted more than 52 million subscribers on the platform. It was subsequently renewed for a second season. Robertson had to learn sign language for her role on the series.

Personal life
Robertson has one child, a daughter born in 2010, from a previous marriage. In October 2019 she announced her engagement on Instagram, though she later deleted the post.

Filmography

Film

Television

Awards and nominations

References

External links

1971 births
Living people
Actresses from Vancouver
Canadian film actresses
Canadian television actresses
Canadian comedy writers
Canadian voice actresses
Canadian sketch comedians
Comedians from Vancouver
Writers from Vancouver
Place of birth missing (living people)
Canadian women comedians
Canadian Comedy Award winners